Donald Zorol Barthley (born 10 May 1966 in Antigua, West Indies) is a former West Indies Under 19 cricket Captain and batsman and a former Chief Cricket Operations Officer for the West Indies Cricket Board.

Career
Barthley played International cricket for Antigua & Barbuda, the Leeward Islands and the West Indian U-19 cricket team. He captained the West Indies at this youth level. After his playing career he has taken on various cricketing managerial and operational roles, including vice-president of the Leeward Islands Cricket Association and Chief Cricket Operations Officer at the WICB. He currently serves as Chairman/CEO of PIC Insurance Co. Ltd.

Teeth incident
John Maynard attributed the origins of his nickname "The Dentist", to an incident when playing for Nevis against Antigua:
There was this bloke playing for Antigua called Zorah Barthley, [sic] who was the West Indies youth team captain... First thing in the morning he nicks one but the umps didn't send him on his way, and that wound me up a bit. And so the next ball was four yards quicker than anything I've ever bowled. He shaped to hook, and his teeth went flying all over the place, and it was a funny old sight. But he was the man who made the Dentist really. I couldn't have done it without him.

Personal life
He is married to Molvie (Joseph) Barthley. They have three sons Dario, Dajun and Dajari. Dario is a youth footballer who attained selection into the Antigua Under 15 Football team and played in the CFU CONCACAF Caribbean Youth Cup, 2007.

References

1966 births
Living people
Leeward Islands cricketers
Antigua and Barbuda cricketers